Baetis flavistriga is a species of small minnow mayfly in the family Baetidae. It is found in Central America and North America. In North America its range includes all of Canada, all of Mexico, and the continental United States.

References

Further reading

 

Mayflies
Articles created by Qbugbot
Insects described in 1921